The Australian cricket team toured the United Arab Emirates from September to October 2018 to play two Tests and three Twenty20 International (T20I) matches against Pakistan. Ahead of the Test series, there was a four-day practice match in Dubai.

In February 2018, the Pakistan Cricket Board (PCB) looked at the possibility of hosting this series and New Zealand's tour to the UAE in Malaysia instead of the UAE, due to domestic Twenty20 fixture congestion in Sharjah. In May 2018, the PCB invited Australia to play the fixtures in Pakistan, but Cricket Australia said it would not allow matches to be moved there. In June 2018, the PCB and the Emirates Cricket Board (ECB) agreed to play Pakistan's future matches in the UAE. 

In September 2018, both Mitchell Marsh and Josh Hazlewood were appointed joint vice-captains of the Australia Test cricket team. The following month, both Mitchell Marsh and Alex Carey were appointed joint vice-captains of the Australia T20I cricket team.

During the second Test match, an extra T20I match for Australia against the United Arab Emirates was added to the tour itinerary. Australia were scheduled to play the UAE in a Twenty20 warm-up match before the T20I series against Pakistan, when the match was upgraded to a full T20I fixture. It was the first time that the UAE played a full T20I match against Australia. Australia won the one-off match by seven wickets.

Pakistan won the Test series 1–0, after the first match ended in a draw. Pakistan won the T20I series against Australia 3–0.

Squads

After Pakistan's Test squad was named, Mohammad Hafeez was later added to the team. Imam-ul-Haq fractured his finger while fielding in the first match, and was ruled out of Pakistan's squad for the second Test. Peter Siddle was added to Australia's T20I squad as cover for Mitchell Starc.

Four-day match: Pakistan A vs Australia

Test series

1st Test

2nd Test

T20I series

United Arab Emirates vs Australia

Only T20I

Pakistan vs Australia

1st T20I

2nd T20I

3rd T20I

Notes

References

External links
 Series home at ESPN Cricinfo

2018 in Australian cricket
2018 in Pakistani cricket
International cricket competitions in 2018–19
Australian cricket tours of Pakistan
International cricket tours of the United Arab Emirates